Ashcombe Park is a country house and estate near Cheddleton, in Staffordshire, England.

The house is a Grade II* listed building, listed on 2 May 1953.

History and description
Botham Hall, built in the 16th century, stood on the site later occupied by Ashcombe Park House; it was once surrounded by a deer park, and in the late 18th century it was owned by the Debank family.

Ashcombe Park House was built from 1807 to 1811 for William Sneyd, after his marriage to Jane Debank. The architect and builder was James Trubshaw. The parkland around the house was designed at about this time; the fishponds date from the 1860s. The property remained in the Sneyd family until 1936.

The house is faced with sandstone ashlar, and has a Tuscan porte-cochère, said to have been moved from another Sneyd house, Belmont Hall in Cheadle. There is a walled garden, and the parkland is surrounded by a stone wall.

See also
 Listed buildings in Cheddleton
 The Ashes, Endon

References

Grade II* listed buildings in Staffordshire
Country houses in Staffordshire